Bursa Province is a province in Turkey along the Sea of Marmara coast in northwestern Anatolia. It borders Balıkesir to the west, Kütahya to the south, Bilecik and Sakarya to the east, Kocaeli to the northeast and Yalova to the north. The province has an area of 11,043 km2 and a population of 3,139,744 as of 2021. Its traffic code is 16.

The vast majority of the Bursa Province districts (and the city of Bursa) are located within the Marmara Region, but the districts of Büyükorhan, Harmancık, Keles and Orhaneli are located within the Aegean Region.

The city of Bursa was the capital of the Ottoman State between 1326 and 1365, until the Ottoman conquest of Edirne, then known as Adrianople, which became the new Ottoman capital between 1365 and 1453, when Constantinople became the final Ottoman capital.

Geography 
Bursa is mostly under the Mediterranean climate climate (Csa and Csb). Inner parts of the province are higher in elevation and show continental characteristics (Dfa and Dsc). Uludağ is the highest mountain in the province with 2,543 meters of elevation.

Districts

Demographics

See also 
 City of Bursa
 İznik
 List of populated places in Bursa Province

References

External links 

 Pictures of the capital of this province